The discography of Christian recording artist Jeremy Camp consists of 14 studio albums, 1 extended plays (EPs), 33 other appearances, and 36 singles.

Discography

Studio albums

Live albums

Compilation albums

Other releases

 Heart of the Artist was a six-track bonus disc given out with the pre-order of Carried Me: The Worship Project.
 Live Session EP (Jeremy Camp album) is an iTunes-exclusive release.

Compilation appearances

Singles

Promotional singles

Other charted songs

Notes

References

Discographies of American artists
Christian music discographies